The 2007 Breckland District Council election was part of the UK's 2007 local elections. All 54 seats were up for election. The Conservatives retained control of the council, increasing their already sizeable majority by six seats despite only a modest rise in vote share.

This was the first election in which UKIP stood candidates in Breckland. The Liberal Party meanwhile failed to stand any candidates at this election, and has not done so since.

Summary of results

References

2007 English local elections
2007